Buried treasure is an important part of the beliefs surrounding pirates and Old West outlaws. See hoard for the concept in archaeology.

Buried treasure may also refer to:

Film and television
Buried Treasure (1915 film), a U.S. silent short film featuring Florence Crawford
Buried Treasure (1921 film), a U.S. silent film featuring Norman Kerry
Buried Treasure (1926 film), a 1926 Our Gang short
Buried Treasure (2001 TV film), aka Hidden Treasure (UK), featuring John Thaw
"Buried Treasure" (Donkey Kong Country episode), a 1998 episode of cartoon series Donkey Kong Country
 "Buried Treasure" (My Name Is Earl), a 2007 episode of the television series My Name Is Earl
 Buried Treasure (Rocky & Bullwinkle episode), 1961 story arc in the animated series Rocky and His Friends
 Buried Treasure (TV series), a 2011 Fox Broadcasting Company television series
 Buried Treasure (UK TV programme), a 1954–59 British archaeological TV series hosted by Sir Mortimer Wheeler
Eveready Harton in Buried Treasure, 1929 pornographic animated cartoon
 "History's Mysteries: Buried Treasure", a 2000 episode of U.S. documentary TV series History's Mysteries
 Barry'd Treasure, a 2014 American reality television series that aired on A&E

Literature
 "Buried Treasure" (short story), a 1936 short story by P. G. Wodehouse
 Buried Treasure (book), a 2007 non-fiction book by Victoria Finlay
Buried Treasures of Chinese Turkestan, 1928 book by German archaeologist Albert von Le Coq

Music
 "Buried Treasure" (song), a 1983 song from Kenny Rogers's album Eyes That See in the Dark
"Buried Treasure", a 1986 song from the Vels' album House of Miracles
"Buried Treasures", a 1978 song from Kenny Rogers's album Love or Something Like It
 Buried Treasures (Dave Brubeck album), a 1967 live album by The Dave Brubeck Quartet, released in 1998
Buried Treasures Vol. I and Buried Treasures Vol. II, 1992 compilation albums by Lindisfarne
Tom Petty's Buried Treasure, 2005 radio show hosted by musician Tom Petty
Buried Treasure: Volume One, 2017 boxset of previously unreleased acoustic tracks by Jimmy Buffett

See also
 Treasure chest (disambiguation)